Paul Cuvelier (22 November 1923 – 5 July 1978) was a Belgian comics artist best known for the comic series Corentin, published by Le Lombard, which first appeared in the first issue of Tintin magazine.

Biography
Paul Cuvelier was born in Lens, Belgium in 1923. He was the third of seven children of doctor Charles Cuvelier, who was an amateur painter. From his early youth on, his main passion was drawing, and he had his first work published in Le Petit Vingtième when he was only seven years old. After studying Latin and Greek in Enghien, he began taking art classes at the academy of Mons for a few months, but left when his teacher declared that there was nothing left that he could teach him. He made his debut in the youth magazine Bravo in 1946 with the Western comic Tom Colby, written by Hergé and Edgar Pierre Jacobs. He was one of the first artists to be contacted for the new Tintin magazine, which started in 1946.

For Tintin, he created his main comics series, Corentin. Trained as a painter, Cuvelier was recognized by his peers as one of the most talented artists, but his series only achieved limited success, and Cuvelier spent his whole career alternating between painting and comics. His main interest was the human body, but the catholic context and juvenile audience of Tintin limited his expressive possibilities. Corentin was his longest lasting series, but with only seven albums published in a span of 25 years, it failed to attract a large and faithful audience; his other series were even more short-lived.

In 1968, he was able to combine his passion for the female nude and his gift for drawing comics in Epoxy, a fantasy about the Greek gods written by Jean Van Hamme, which is considered to be one of the first adult comics of Europe.

Ultimately, the lack of commercial success and the burden on his creativity of repeatedly drawing the same figures, inherent to the creation of comics, wore Cuvelier out, and from 1973 until his death 5 years later, he devoted his time to painting. He died in 1978 in Mont-sur-Marchienne.

Bibliography
 Le Canyon mystérieux, 1 album, 1947, story by Hergé and Edgar Pierre Jacobs. Editions du Berger
 Corentin, 7 albums, 1950–1974, stories by Jean Van Melkebeke, Cuvelier, Greg, Acar, and Jean Van Hamme. Le Lombard and Dargaud
 Epoxy, 1 album, 1968, erotic story by Jean Van Hamme. Éric Losfeld
 Flamme d'argent, 3 albums, 1965–1981, story by Greg. Le Lombard, Dargaud, and Cygne
 Line, 5 albums, 1966–1985, story by Greg. Le Lombard, Dargaud, and Bédéscope
 Wapi, 2 albums, 1969–1981, story by Benoît and Acar. Le Lombard and Dargaud

Awards
 1974: Award for best realistic artwork at the Prix Saint-Michel, Brussels

References

 Béra, Michel; Denni, Michel; and Mellot, Philippe (1998): "Trésors de la Bande Dessinée 1999–2000". Paris, Les éditions de l'amateur. 
 Paul Cuvelier publications in Belgian Tintin and French Tintin BDoubliées 
Footnotes

External links
 The Paul Cuvelier foundation 
 Paul Cuvelier biography on Lambiek Comiclopedia
 Paul Cuvelier biography on Le Lombard 
 Paul Cuvelier homage site 

1923 births
1978 deaths
People from Hainaut (province)
Belgian comics artists
Belgian erotic artists
Walloon people
20th-century Belgian painters